The 8th World Festival of Youth and Students featured an athletics competition among its programme of events. Organised under the Union Internationale des Étudiants (UIE), the events were contested in Helsinki, Finland in August 1962. Mainly contested among Eastern European athletes, it served as an alternative to the Universiade. It was the final time that a major international athletics competition was incorporated into the festival, as athletics at the Universiade grew to be the most prominent student athletics venue for both Western and Eastern-aligned countries.

Medal summary

Men

Women

Medal table

References

Sources
Results
World Student Games (UIE). GBR Athletics. Retrieved on 2014-12-15.

World Festival of Youth and Students
World Festival of Youth and Students
World Festival of Youth and Students
1962 World Festival
1962
1960s in Helsinki